The UEFA Cup Winners' Cup (CWC) was an annual association football cup competition organized by UEFA since 1960. Prior to 1994 the tournament was officially called the European Cup Winners' Cup. The competition was a straight knockout competition open only to the cup winner club of each country, or the losing finalist, if the winner managed a double. After the establishment of the UEFA Champions League (formerly called the European Champion Clubs' Cup) in the early 1990s, the standing and prestige of the Cup Winners' Cup began to decline. With the expansion of the Champions League in 1997 to allow more than one team from the highest ranked member associations to enter, the CWC began to look noticeably inferior. By the late 1990s, the CWC had come to be seen as a second-rate competition with only one or two big name teams available to enter each year and the interest in the tournament from both major clubs and the public dropped. Finally, with the further expansion of the UEFA Champions League to include as many as three or four teams from the top footballing nations, the decision was taken to abolish the competition after the end of the 1998–99 tournament, which was won by Lazio.

All-time top scorers

Top scorers by season

The top scorer award is for the player who amassed the most goals in the tournament.

By player

 * Two or more players were equal top scorers.
  List is ordered by date of accomplishment.

By club

 * Two or more players were equal top scorers.
 List is ordered by date of accomplishment.

By country

 * Two or more players were equal top scorers.
  List is ordered by date of accomplishment.

Notes

References

top scorers
UEFA Cup Winners
UEFA Cup Winners